Hanover Western is a parliamentary constituency represented in the House of Representatives of the Jamaican Parliament. It elects one Member of Parliament (MP) by the first past the post system of election.  It was one of the 32 constituencies fixed in the new constitution granted to Jamaica in 1944. The constituency has featured in all 16 contested Parliamentary General Elections from 1944 to 2016. The current MP is Tamika Davis.

The MP was formerly Ian Hayles, representing the People's National Party, who has been in office since 2007.

Boundaries 

The constituency covers four electoral divisions – Cauldwell, Green Island, Lucea and Riverside.

Members of Parliament

1944 to Present

Elections

Elections from 2000 to Present

See also
 Politics of Jamaica
 Elections in Jamaica

References

Parliamentary constituencies of Jamaica